Freedom Township is a township in Ellis County, Kansas, USA.  As of the 2010 census, its population was 118.

Geography
According to the USGS, it contains one cemetery, Holy Cross.

The streams of Duck Creek and Eagle Creek run through this township.

References
 USGS Geographic Names Information System (GNIS)

External links
 US-Counties.com
 City-Data.com

Townships in Ellis County, Kansas
Townships in Kansas